Josefina Cuesta Bustillo (4 March 1947 – 30 March 2021) was a Spanish historian, a professor of contemporary history at the University of Salamanca.

Her speciality was social history and equality of women in Spain in the 20th century. She died in Salamanca on 30 March 2021, at the age of 74. At the time of her death she was catedrática emérita at the Centro de Estudios de la Mujer (Centre for women's studies) at the University of Salamanca.

Selected works

References

1947 births
2021 deaths
Spanish women historians
Contemporary historians
Social historians
Immigration historians
Intellectual historians
20th-century Spanish historians
21st-century Spanish historians
Academic staff of the University of Salamanca
20th-century Spanish women writers